National Front Party may refer to several different political parties:

National Front Party (Indonesia)
National Front Party (Iran)
National Front Party (Libya)
National Front Party (Papua New Guinea)

See also
National Front (disambiguation)